Robert Denholm Baxter (23 January 1911 – April 1991) was a Scottish footballer best known for his time with English club Middlesbrough.

Career
Baxter was born in the Gilmerton area of Edinburgh. A dominating centre half and a great tackler, he joined Middlesbrough from junior club Musselburgh Bruntonians in 1931 after being spotted by manager Peter McWilliam. The match McWilliam had been to Scotland to watch had been cancelled and after going to watch Musselburgh instead, he spotted the young defender and decided to sign him.

Baxter went on to play 247 times for Middlesbrough, playing in nine different positions and later became club captain. He remained at Middlesbrough until 1946, but played for both Heart of Midlothian and Hibernian in unofficial matches during World War II. While at Middlesbrough he earned three caps for the Scotland national team, the third as captain against England in 1939. He subsequently played against England in four unofficial internationals during the war, and also made an appearance for the Scottish League XI in a 1941 fundraising match, although the league itself was not operating (officially the team represented the wartime Southern League) and he was only a guest player (for Hibs) at the time.

Upon the return of official professional football in the 1946–47 season, Baxter returned to Scotland where he played for Hearts for a single season. In 1947 he became manager of Leith Athletic and was also joint manager of Scottish speedway team Edinburgh Monarchs. He later managed Cowdenbeath, where he was appointed in 1951.

Baxter's son, also named Bobby, played professional football for Darlington, Brighton & Hove Albion and Torquay United.

See also
List of Scotland wartime international footballers
List of Scottish football families

References

1911 births
1991 deaths
Scottish footballers
Scottish Football League players
English Football League players
Musselburgh Athletic F.C. players
Scottish Junior Football Association players
Heart of Midlothian F.C. players
Heart of Midlothian F.C. wartime guest players
Hibernian F.C. wartime guest players
Middlesbrough F.C. players
Scotland international footballers
Scotland wartime international footballers
Scottish football managers
Cowdenbeath F.C. managers
Scottish Football League representative players
Leith Athletic F.C. managers
Scottish Football League managers
Place of death missing
Association football central defenders